Donia is a town in southwestern Guinea.  It is near the border with Sierra Leone.

Transport 

 Railway stations in Guinea.

References 

Populated places in Guinea